Marie-Julien Dunand (January 23, 1841August 4, 1915), also known in Chinese as Du Ang, was the former Roman Catholic apostolic vicar of North-Western Sichuan from 1893 to 1915. He was a recipient of the Legion of Honour.

Biography

Early life
Dunand was born in Saint-Jean-de-Belleville on January 23, 1841.
He was ordained a priest in 1863 and worked as a teacher and vicar in Albertville for about five years. He joined the Paris Foreign Missions Society in 1868, left for China in 1869 and arrived in 1870. In China, Dunand first worked as a missionary, but was soon nominated to direct the seminary at Muping, Baoxing, Ya'an.

Apostolic vicar 
In 1886, Annet-Théophile Pinchon, the Apostolic Vicar of North-western Sichuan, appointed Dunand to be the vicar general in charge of Chongqingzhou, near Chengdu. After Pinchon's death in 1891, Dunand directed the mission for two years. In 1893, he was appointed the Apostolic Vicar of North-western Sichuan and also became the titular bishop of Caloe.

Anti-missionary riots 
In 1895, an anti-missionary riot broke out in Chengdu, which destroyed the episcopal residence, the cathedral, and other oratories around Chengdu. Dunand was injured and fled. Different sources give conflicting accounts about Dunand's injury: the France-Asian Research Institute (IRFA) said Dunand almost died, but Wang Anming from Chengdu Folk Culture Research Association asserted that Dunand was only slightly injured.

Following the riot, Dunand directed Jacques-Victor-Marius Rouchouse to build the current Cathedral of the Immaculate Conception. Additionally, he planned for the construction of Annunciation Seminary in Bailu, Pengzhou, a location farther from Chengdu, in response to the violent incident.

The apostolic vicariate under Dunand saw local uprisings in 1896, in 1900 during the Boxer Rebellion, and in 1902, in which Dunand had to request the aid of a French gunboat.

Death 
Dunand died in Chengdu in 1915. The French and English consuls as well as Chinese civil and military representatives attended his funeral. He was buried at Mopan Mountain near Chengdu, where Louis Gabriel Taurin Dufresse was also buried. He was succeeded by Jacques-Victor-Marius Rouchouse as the apostolic vicar.

Legacy

Charity 
According to the French-Asia Research Institute (IRFA), Dunand worked for the education of youth and the relief of the sick during his leadership. He opened an orphanage, a hospital and a hospice for the poor and entrusted them to the Franciscan Sisters of Mary. He also opened a school for boys, which was entrusted to the Marist Brothers.

Architecture 

Dunand initiated the construction of the Cathedral of the Immaculate Conception, Chengdu and the Annunciation Seminary, Pengzhou. The cathedral and the attached episcopal residence were completed in 1904 and remains in operation. The seminary was completed in 1907, abandoned in 1949, collapsed in the 2008 Sichuan earthquake, and rebuilt in 2016. Both the cathedral and the seminary sites are Major Historical and Cultural Sites Protected at the National Level of China.

See also 
 Catholic Church in Sichuan
 Cathedral of the Immaculate Conception, Chengdu
 Annunciation Seminary, Pengzhou

References

Notes

Citations

External links 
 Dunand's record from the France-Asia Research Institute (in French)

 
 

 
 

20th-century Roman Catholic bishops in China
1841 births
1915 deaths
Roman Catholic missionaries in Sichuan
French Roman Catholic bishops in Asia
Paris Foreign Missions Society bishops